The  National Football League season resulted in a tie for the Western Division championship between the Chicago Bears and Green Bay Packers, requiring an unscheduled one-game playoff. The two teams had finished the regular season with identical 10–1 records and had split their season series, with the road teams winning. The Bears were defending league champions, and the Packers had won the NFL title in 1939.

This divisional championship game was played on December 14 at Wrigley Field. The winner then hosted the New York Giants (8–3) on December 21 in the NFL Championship Game.

Tournament bracket

Western Division championship

NFL Championship game

References

1941
Playoffs